Deutsche Schule Bukarest (DSBU) is a German international school in Bucharest, Romania, established in 2007.

It includes a nursery school (Kinderkrippe), kindergarten, elementary school (Grundschule), and high school (Gymnasium).

See also
 Germans of Romania
 Germany–Romania relations

References

External links
  Deutsche Schule Bukarest
  
  

International schools in Bucharest
High schools in Bucharest
Bucharest
Germany–Romania relations